"For a Boy" is a song co-written and recorded by American country music artist RaeLynn. It was released to radio on March 23, 2015.  RaeLynn wrote the song with Laura Veltz.

History
RaeLynn told Entertainment Tonight that "I wrote it about this dinner date I went on, and this guy was super transparent with me and kinda wore his heart on his sleeve…You know, guys always wanna be macho and that kinda thing, so I had this idea of 'for a boy, this guy's pretty transparent and cool.'"

Critical reception
Giving it a "C", Kevin John Coyne of Country Universe wrote that "She’s simply too green for me to take seriously her low level of expectations for both genders. 'For a Boy' is decently constructed, has a production that recalls SHeDAISY, and she sings it just fine."

Music video
The music video was directed by TK McKamy and premiered in May 2015.

Chart performance
The song debuted on the Bubbling Under Hot 100 chart at No. 15, selling 27,000 copies in the US on its debut week. The song peaked at #58 becoming her lowest charting single to date. 
The song has sold 77,000 copies in the United States as of July 2015.

References

2015 singles
2015 songs
RaeLynn songs
Big Machine Records singles
Song recordings produced by Joey Moi
Music videos directed by TK McKamy
Songs written by Laura Veltz